Cash assistance may refer to:
Administration of federal assistance in the United States
Cash transfer, a direct transfer payment of money to an eligible person
Cash and Voucher Assistance, humanitarian aid programs that provide cash, or vouchers exchangeable for goods and services, directly to recipients
Welfare, a type of government support intended to ensure that members of a society can meet basic human needs